is a chain of indoor amusement parks created by Sega and run by CA Sega Joypolis. Beginning on July 20, 1994 with the original location sited in Yokohama, Japan, Joypolis centers have since opened in several cities in Japan and later China. The parks feature arcade games and amusement rides based on Sega's intellectual properties, original themes, and licensed franchises. Alongside the predecessor Galbo venues and the overseas spin-offs SegaWorld London and Sega World Sydney, they were officially referred to under the "Amusement Theme Park" or "ATP" concept by Sega in the 1990s.

Overall, eleven Joypolis theme parks have been opened, but as of 2021, five parks remain operational; two in Japan (Tokyo and a Sports Center in Sendai) and three in China (Qingdao, Shanghai and Guangzhou); the failure of many of the parks has largely been attributed to poor visitor numbers, managerial problems, and cost-cutting measures, with the closures and downsizing of several occurring in the midst of Sega's companywide losses during the early 2000s.

After its formation the previous year to operate the parks, Sega announced in 2016 that China Animations would acquire a majority stake in Sega Live Creation (now CA Sega Joypolis) for 600 million yen, effective January 2017. All three currently operating Joypolis branches are no longer fully controlled by Sega, although their attractions, branding, and intellectual properties continue to be used under license from them for the foreseeable future.

Locations

Operating

Japan

Tokyo
The flagship Joypolis park is located in Odaiba area of Tokyo, and originally opened on 12 July 1996. Currently, it is the only Japanese Joypolis park to remain in operation and has been refurbished twice - in December 2000 and early 2012.

Sendai (Joypolis Sports)
In January 2022, a new format under the Joypolis name was officially announced. Joypolis Sports is a sports center located in Izumi-ku, Sendai on the Sendai Nakayama complex and will heavily focus on sports-related activities, as well as a few minor non-Sports facilities like a Comic Book section, and a small arcade. The venue was originally planned to open on March 18, but this opening window was put on hold a day before opening following the 2022 Fukushima earthquake. On April 13, the venue announced a new opening date of April 29.

China

Shanghai
The first Joypolis park in China opened in the Changning District of Shanghai, and opened in two phases: the first in December 2014, and the second in February 2016.

Qingdao
In July 2015, a Joypolis venue opened in Qingdao. This is the only one of the Chinese venues to be directly owned by CA Sega Joypolis and not licensed to their owner China Animations.

Guangzhou
In January 2021, it was announced that a Joypolis park would open in Guangzhou on the Junming Happy World complex later in the year which will contain 40 attractions. It will be the first Joypolis venue to open in South China.

It was originally planned to open in September 2021, but after a delay, the venue opened on May 9, 2022.

Closed

Yokohama
The first flagship Joypolis theme park was located in Yokohama, opening on July 20, 1994. It was the second park to launch under Sega's "Amusement Theme Park" concept after the Osaka ATC Galbo venue in Osaka, which had opened three months previously. Initially exceeding its expected revenue and visitor number targets, it lagged behind after its flagship status was superseded by the larger Tokyo branch.

The venue reopened as Joypolis H. Factory on July 25, 1999 as part of a partnership with media personality and comedian Hiromi. Due to restructurings at Sega, the venue closed permanently on 28 February 2001. Nearby facilities, including on-site McDonald's outlets, initially continued to operate.

The building formerly housing the park was subsequently used as a warehouse, before being demolished to make way for an apartment block.

Niigata
On 9 December 1995, the second Joypolis venue opened in Chūō-ku, Niigata City. Sega transitioned the operating rights of the park to an outside company, Magic City Co, Ltd. in April 1998, due to poor performance after its first year.

The park was rebranded by the new operators as Magic City @Niigata Joypolis, featuring an electronic card payment system, and having most of its virtual attractions replaced with standard theme park rides. It closed permanently after further management issues on January 16, 2001.

The building that formerly housed the park later became part of the Bandai City Billboard Place entertainment complex and was renamed the BP2, consisting of retail stores on the first and second floors (including a branch of the Niigata City Manga / Anime Information Center) and a cinema on the third floor.

Fukuoka
On April 20, 1996, a Joypolis opened in Fukuoka as one of the opening tenants of the Canal City Hakata complex. The venue closed on 24 September 2001 due to restructuring at Sega. The venue was split into two, one half became home to a Ramen Stadium restaurant and the other half was retained by Sega, who reopened the downsized arcade as a Club Sega venue, and operated it until the late-2000s when it was replaced with a Taito Station.

Shinjuku
A Joypolis in Shinjuku opened on October 4, 1996. Located on the tenth and eleventh floors of the Shinjuku Takashimaya branch on its opening day, it was one of the venue's major entertainment tenants alongside an IMAX theatre. The park became the first Joypolis to close permanently on August 22, 2000, with competition from Tokyo Joypolis elsewhere in the capital officially cited. The floors formerly housing the park are used as an art gallery (10) and an exhibition hall (11).

Kyoto
A Joypolis opened in Kyoto on September 11, 1997, located on the tenth floor of the local branch of Isetan. Though still containing a number of newly-developed attractions, it took up a significantly smaller floor space compared to most other Joypolis venues, and no entry fees were charged. The venue closed on August 22, 2002, due to unprofitability, which by its final years only two attractions (Sega Touring Car Championship Special and Wild River) operated. The floor where the park once existed now houses sections selling souvenirs.

Okayama
A Joypolis opened in Yokohama on July 18, 1998. It was part of the Joyful Town complex operated by Ito Yokado, consisting of other unrelated venues. A Sonic-themed bowling was located on the third floor of the property, alongside karaoke rooms.

On March 23, 2008, all the remaining attractions were removed from the complex, followed up with the bowling alley and karaoke facilities on July 17. Unlike the other venues, the operations were transferred to Sega Entertainment Co, Ltd. in October 2012 due to its arcade status.

The venue closed on 2 September 2018 after all tenants of the Joyful Town complex were notified to leave their premises due to redevelopment. The building was demolished in November that year.

Umeda
On November 28, 1998, a Joypolis opened in Umeda, Osaka as part of the Hep Five shopping centre complex, located on the 8th and 9th floors. It was the last Joypolis venue to be opened by Sega in the 1990s. The venue closed on May 6, 2018, after its lease expired.

A Namco VR Zone later opened up in the space in September of that year, trading until 25 October 2020.

VR Shibuya
Around October 2018, a Joypolis-branded venue opened in Shibuya. This venue specifically focused on VR attractions, similar to a Namco VR Zone and other VR arcades. The venue closed on 30 June 2020.

Joypolis attractions

Tokyo Joypolis

Normal attractions

Floor 1
 Gekion Live Coaster: A roller-coaster that is combined with a music game. It was built by Gerstlauer Amusement Rides GmbH. When Gekion first opened in 2012, it was the world's first spinning coaster with an inversion and launch. The attraction formerly traded as Veil of Dark, until 2016, which featured a different form of gameplay that starts off as a shooting dark ride using controllers mounted to the restraints. There are two shooting sections separated by a short chain lift prior to the tire launch.
 Halfpipe Tokyo: A snowboarding ride and is set to music.
 The Joypolis Explorer: A mystery attraction where Joypolis attendees need to uncover the treasure warehouse.
 Pirate's Plunder: A pirate-themed shooting attraction.
 Spicy Taxi: A driving simulator that has 360-degree cars. The attraction formerly traded as one based on the game Initial D Arcade Stage 4 when it first opened in 2007.
 Zero Latency VR: A VR attraction where Joypolis attendees need to visit space with VR headsets.

Floor 2
 House of the Dead: Scarlet Dawn: The Attraction: An attraction that is based on House of the Dead: Scarlet Dawn.
 Sonic Athletics: A Sonic the Hedgehog-themed racing game that is powered by a treadmill.
 Storm-G: A bobsleigh simulator that rotates 360 degrees.
 TOWER TAG: A modern multiplayer Virtual Reality PvP laser-shooter.
 Transformers: Human Alliance Special: A ride version of the arcade game Transformers: Human Alliance. The cabinet is similar to Sega's R-360 machine.

Floor 3
 Ace Attorney in Joypolis: An attraction that is based on the Ace Attorney visual novel series.
 Attack on Titan: The ATTRACTION: A walkthrough attraction that is based on the Attack on Titan manga series.
 Fortune Forest: is a virtual forest that tells Joypolis attendees what their futures will be like.
 JOYPOLI_SUGOROKU: A unique game of Sugoroku. In this game Joypolis attendees need to explore through JOYPOLI_SUGOROKU.
 Lola and Carla: the Beauty Contest: An attraction where Joypolis attendees answer questions to create a character.
 Mystic Mansion: Tale of Pandemonium: A horror-themed 3D ride.
 MURDER LODGE: A sega-original horror-themed attraction that previously operated at the park when it first opened.
 SADAKO - The Curse Psychic Manor: An attraction that is based on the Sadako 2019 movie.
 Wild Jungle Brothers: A jungle-themed jeep simulator.
 Wild River: The Treasure Hunt: A jungle-themed dinghy simulator.
 Wind Wing: A jungle-themed hang glider simulator.

Former attractions
 Spin Bullet: A spinning coaster built by Masago Industrial. The attraction first opened in 1996 as Rail Chase: The Ride, but then, it was renamed to Speed Boarder in 1999. The cars could seat two riders side-by-side. The ride was renamed to its final name in 2006 with a change in cars, and was removed in 2011 during Joypolis' 2012 refurbishment, which was replaced with a new coaster.

Other attractions
 JP Store: A store that sells Sega-themed merchandise and souvenirs.
 Main Stage: A stage that is located in the main atrium of the park and houses events.
 Multi Stage: A stage that is located in Frame Cafe.
 Prizes Corner: An area containing UFO catchers, with merchandise exclusive to Joypolis.
 Sonic Carnival: A section for younger Joypolis attendees featuring carnival games themed to Sonic and his friends.
 Sonic Ghost Shooting: An interactive shooting dark ride.
 Space Interaction: Zones that fuse the digital world with the real world.

Restaurants
 Crepe Store: A crepe-selling store.
 D-Lounge: An interactive lounge that serves Joypolis attendees snacks and drinks. This is the only area of the park that serves Joypolis attendees alcohol.
 Dippin' Dots Ice Cream: A Dippin' Dots-selling store.
 Frame Cafe: A café that provides the views of Tokyo.

Qingdao Joypolis

Normal attractions
 Animal Treasure Box: An attraction where Joypolis attendees need to look for animals in a 3D environment.
 Beautiful Test: A picture-showcase attraction.
 Chuang Jurassic: A 3D simulator.
 Deadly Blitz: A VR shooting game.
 Fortune Forest: is a virtual forest that tells Joypolis attendees what their futures will be like.
 GO GO Jockey!: An arcade-game that is powered with a plastic horse that Joypolis attendees need to ride on.
 Horror House: A haunted house-themed attraction.
 Initial D Arcade Stage 4 Limited: A driving simulator that is based on the manga series of the same name. Joypolis attendees sit in real cars for this game.
 Search Impossible: A haunted house-themed attraction.
 Sega Lightning Knight: A roller-coaster that has an interactive shooting element.
 Sonic Athletics: A Sonic the Hedgehog-themed racing game that is powered by a treadmill.
 Sonic Brain Ranking: A attraction that tests Joypolis attendees trivia about the Sonic the Hedgehog franchise.
 Sonic Jumping Tour: A Sonic the Hedgehog-themed 4D attraction.
 Sonic Star Race: A Sonic the Hedgehog-themed bumper-car ride.
 Sonic Tropical Resort: A Sonic the Hedgehog-themed hot-air-balloon ride.
 Spy Mission: A jungle-themed hang glider simulator.
 The First Scene: A VR attraction that is powered with a chair.
 Transformers: Human Alliance Special: A ride version of the arcade game Transformers: Human Alliance. The cabinet is similar to Sega's R-360 machine.
 VR Bing Feng Warriors: A VR attraction.
 VR God-Arrow: A shooting simulator where Joypolis attendees need to use VR headsets.
 VR Living Dollhouse: A VR horror game.
 VR Snow Competition: A snowboarding simulator where Joypolis attendees need to use VR headsets.
 VR Space Warrior: A VR version of a popular game series.
 Wind Wing: A jungle-themed hang glider simulator.

Other attractions
 Balloon Walker: A luck-based game.
 Clown Cannon: A themed Skee-Ball set.
 Sea Fishing: A fishing simulator.
 Stage: A stage area.
 Thunder MT: An area that is dedicated to holding machines of the Thunder MT arcade-game.
 UFO Catchers: An area that is dedicated to UFO catcher machines.

Restaurants
D-Lounge: An interactive lounge that serves Joypolis attendees snacks and drinks.

Joypolis Sports

Activities
 Inline skating
 Roller skating
 Skateboarding
 Casterboarding
 Struck 9 Pitching Game
 Igoball
 Comic Corner
 E-Sports Corner
 Party game Corner
 Darts 
 Karaoke Box
 Billiards
 Boccia 360
 Mölkky
 Cue sports
 Table Tennis
 Billiker
 Stack Line Balance Beam
 Trampolining
 Bouldering
 Foot Darts
 Archery Hunt
 Futsal
 Bubble football
 Badminton
 Volleyball
 Teqball
 Hedis
 Basketball
 BOSS Soccer (Virtual)
 BOSS MixRun (Virtual)
 BOSS Tennis (Virtual)
 Amusement Game Corner

Accident history
On April 20, 2005, Sega Corp. closed its Tokyo Joypolis (Odaiba area) theme park temporarily, pending a police investigation and an internal investigation into park safety procedures. The action came in the wake of an accident on the previous Monday in which a 30-year-old man died after he fell out of a ride. The ride, called "Viva! Skydiving," is a simulator ride that is designed to give passengers an experience of virtual skydiving. Apparently, the ride's operators allowed the overweight man to board the ride, even though the safety belt was not long enough to fit around his body. The man was secured only by an over-the-shoulder restraint, but Sega president Hisao Oguchi says that the restraint was locked in a "more loose position," causing the man to fall out. 
Reports indicate that, while Sega's official park operations manual forbids riders from riding without seat belts, Tokyo Joypolis had given its employees an unofficial manual that allowed ride operators to use their own discretion as to whether a person could board a ride. Sega says it was unaware that the park had its own manual.

See also
 SegaWorld, An arcade that refers to a chain of game centres/arcades in numerous countries (primarily Japan) that are operated by Sega since 1989, as well as defunct indoor theme-park installations in the United Kingdom and Australia.
 GameWorks, An arcade that refers to mixed-use entertainment venues which were formerly operated by Sega in the United States.
 Sega Republic, A defunct indoor theme-park located at The Dubai Mall, Dubai, United Arab Emirates. It Was considered the first Sega-licensed indoor theme-park in the Middle East.

References

External links
Sega Japan's Joypolis homepage 

Arcade video games
Indoor amusement parks
Amusement parks in Japan
Sega amusement parks
Video arcades
1994 establishments in Japan
Buildings and structures in Tokyo
Tourist attractions in Tokyo
Amusement parks opened in 1994